Luc Villalonga (born June 9, 1970 in Oyonnax) is a French professional football player. Currently, he plays in the Championnat de France amateur for RCO Agde.

He played on the professional level in Ligue 2 for FC Sète.

1970 births
Living people
People from Oyonnax
French footballers
Ligue 2 players
FC Sète 34 players
RCO Agde players
Association football midfielders
Sportspeople from Ain
Footballers from Auvergne-Rhône-Alpes